This Side Up is the second album by hardcore punk band Scream, released in 1985 on the Dischord Records label.

Track listing
"Bet You Never Thought" - 2:52
"Things to Do Today" - 1:25
"This Side Up" - 2:27
"Gluesniff" - 2:21
"Still Screaming" - 6:29
"A No Money Down" - 2:03
"Show and Tell Me Baby" - 1:47
"The Zoo Closes at Dark" - 1:40
"I Look When You Walk" - 4:08
"Iron Curtain" 3:46

Personnel
Scream - producer
Pete Stahl - lead vocals
Franz Stahl - guitars
Robert Lee Davidson - guitars, backing vocals (tracks 6-10)
Skeeter Thompson - bass guitar, backing vocals
Kent Stax - drums, acoustic guitar (track 4)
Doctor Know - producer, piano (track 5)
Joey Pea - producer
Don Zientara - producer
Doc Night - saxophone (track 5)
Amy Pickering - backing vocals (track 9)

Scream (band) albums
1985 albums